The Augustineum Secondary School, established in 1866, is among the oldest schools in Namibia. Originally situated in Otjimbingwe, it was relocated to Okahandja in 1890, and finally to Windhoek in 1968. Previously also known as the Augustineum Training College and today the Augustineum Secondary School, it is a public school located in Khomasdal, a suburb of Windhoek.

History
Missionary Carl Hugo Hahn established the Augustineum as a seminary and teacher training college in Otjimbingwe in 1866. The name was chosen from Augustine of Hippo, "father of the church in Africa". In 1890 the institution had 14 students and was led by missionary Gottlieb Viehe. In this year it was moved from Otjimbingwe to Okahandja.

December 1959 saw a student uprising at Augustineum, caused by the Old Location Uprising in Windhoek. Hidipo Hamutenya was a notable participant. In 1968 the Augustineum was shifted to Windhoek.

Current state

In 2013 the Augustineum was the sixth worst performing school in the country.

Alumni
The school has produced many notable professionals:
 Faustina Caley, deputy Minister of Education, Arts and Culture (class of 1978)
 Justus ǁGaroëb, king of the Damara people and opposition politician
 Hage Geingob, President of Namibia and former Prime Minister (1990-2002)
 Theo-Ben Gurirab, Second Prime Minister of Namibia (2002-2005). Former president of the United Nations General Assembly (1999-2000) and speaker of the National Assembly of Namibia (2005-2015)
 Hidipo Hamutenya, former leader of the opposition party Rally for Democracy and Progress
 Muesee Kazapua, since 2014 mayor of Windhoek
 Peter Katjavivi, speaker of the National Assembly of Namibia
 Panduleni Itula, Namibian dentist and opposition politician
 Rosa Namises, human rights activist and former parliamentarian for the Congress of Democrats (1999-2005 and 2009-2010)
 Mose Penaani Tjitendero (1943–2006), former Deputy Prime Minister and first Speaker of Parliament, National Hero of Namibia
 Tjama Tjivikua, former Rector of the Namibia University of Science and Technology

See also
 Education in Namibia
 List of schools in Namibia

References

Schools in Windhoek
Boarding schools in Namibia
Okahandja
Otjimbingwe
Educational institutions established in 1866
1866 establishments in South West Africa